Houzhuang Station, formerly spelled as Houjhuang and Houchuang, and spelled as Koshō during Japanese rule, is a railway station on the Taiwan Railways Administration Pingtung line located in Daliao District, Kaohsiung, Taiwan.

History
The station was opened on 25 June 1908.

See also
 List of railway stations in Taiwan

References

1908 establishments in Taiwan
Railway stations in Kaohsiung
Railway stations opened in 1908
Railway stations served by Taiwan Railways Administration